Come Dancing was a British ballroom dancing competition show that ran on and off on the BBC from 1949 to 1998. Unlike its follow-up show, Strictly Come Dancing, contestants were not celebrities.

The show was created by Eric Morley, the founder of Miss World, and began in 1949 by broadcasting from regional ballroom studios, with professional dancers Syd Perkin and Edna Duffield on hand to offer teaching. In 1953, the format changed to become a competition with dancers representing the home nations (England, Northern Ireland, Scotland, and Wales), with later series seeing regions of the United Kingdom going head to head for the coveted trophy.

In 1950, Come Dancing joined Television Dancing Club, and the two programmes ran on alternate weeks until 1964, when the latter finished. At its peak, in the late 1960s and 1970s, it attracted audiences of ten million. The last regular series was aired in 1995 (with no series in 1982 or 1987), this was followed by International Come Dancing specials in 1996 and 1998. The final episode, a 50th anniversary special, was aired on 29 December 1998.

In 2023, BBC Four began repeating episodes of the show from the 1970s.

Presenters
The many presenters over the years included Peter West, McDonald Hobley, Charles Nove, Terry Wogan, Brian Johnston, Angela Rippon, Michael Aspel, David Jacobs, Judith Chalmers, Pete Murray and Rosemarie Ford. Commentators included Ray Moore, Bruce Hammal and Charles Nove.

Revival
In 2004, a relaunched celebrity version entitled Strictly Come Dancing, hosted by Bruce Forsyth (2004–13), Tess Daly and Claudia Winkleman (2014–) debuted on BBC One, and became a success with Saturday evening audiences. The title is an amalgamation of the titles of both the 1992 Australian film Strictly Ballroom and Come Dancing. The format of the newer show has been successfully exported to other countries as Dancing with the Stars or similar names in local languages.

References

External links

1949 British television series debuts
1998 British television series endings
1950s British television series
1960s British television series
1970s British television series
1980s British television series
1990s British television series
BBC Television shows
Ballroom dance
Dance competition television shows
English-language television shows
Television series by BBC Studios